Philip Trent Jewett (born March 3, 1964 in Dallas, Texas) is an American baseball coach and former minor league baseball player.  He recently served as the bench coach for the Seattle Mariners from 2014 to 2015. He spent 2013 as the third-base coach of the Washington Nationals. Jewett joined the Nationals' coaching staff at the beginning of 2011 as a Major League coach, and later spent part of 2011 and all of 2012 as the Nationals' first-base coach.

Playing career
Jewett graduated from R.L. Turner High School, Carrollton, Texas, in 1982, and went on to the University of North Texas where he majored in business and played on the baseball team as catcher. He earned a Bachelor of Business Administration in 1988.

Jewett spent four seasons in the Pirates farm system as a catcher. For his career he had a .172 batting average with two HR and 26 RBI in 113 career games.

Minor-league manager
Jewett spent 17 years as a manager in Minor League Baseball, mostly in the Pittsburgh Pirates organization, including nine and a half seasons managing at the Triple-A level. Jewett has an overall MiLB managerial record of 1,178 wins and 1,166 losses for a winning percentage of .503. He won division titles in 1995 (Carolina Mudcats), 2003 (Nashville Sounds) and 2006 (Indianapolis Indians), and he led the Carolina Mudcats to the 1995 Southern League pennant.

In 2009, Jewett began his first of two years as a manager in the Nationals' minor league system.  He led their High-A affiliate, the Potomac Nationals, in 2009 before being promoted to manage the Triple-A Syracuse Chiefs for 2010.

Coaching career
In the middle of the 2000 season, Jewett was promoted to the major-league Pirates as third-base coach, a position he held in Pittsburgh until the end of the 2002 season.  This was his only hiatus from minor-league managing until he joined the Nationals' major-league coaching staff in 2011. On August 27, 2014, Jewett became interim manager for the weekend series against the Washington Nationals while Lloyd McClendon attended a wedding.

External links

 Retrosheet

References

1964 births
Living people
Sportspeople from Dallas
Pittsburgh Pirates coaches
Seattle Mariners coaches
Washington Nationals coaches
Major League Baseball bench coaches
Major League Baseball third base coaches
Indianapolis Indians managers
Nashville Sounds managers
Gulf Coast Pirates players
Harrisburg Senators players
University of North Texas alumni
Syracuse Chiefs managers
Players of American football from Dallas